Borealis Glacier is in North Cascades National Park in the U.S. state of Washington and is on the north slopes of Primus Peak. The lower section has been retreating significantly, and between 1990 and 2009 lost almost  in length, creating a proglacial lake at the terminus.

See also
List of glaciers in the United States

References

Glaciers of the North Cascades
Glaciers of Skagit County, Washington
Glaciers of Washington (state)